Walter Frith (29 July 1856, London – 25 July 1941, Putney) was a barrister, author, and drama critic.

Walter Frith, a son of the famous painter William Powell Frith, was educated at Harrow and then at Trinity Hall, Cambridge, where he graduated B.A. 1879, LL.B. 1879, and M.A. 1882. He was admitted to Inner Temple on 25 January 1876 and called to the Bar on 9 June 1880. He wrote fourteen plays and three novels.

In 1898 he married Maud Law, widow of Rev. W. Law. One of Walter Frith's sisters was Jane Ellen Panton.

Novels

References

External links

1856 births
1941 deaths
People educated at Harrow School
Alumni of Trinity Hall, Cambridge
English male dramatists and playwrights
English male novelists